Infanterist (en: infantryman) – was the designation to the lowest private rank of infantry, the biggest armed forces branch of the common Austro-Hungarian Army (k.u.k. Army) from 1867 to 1918.

However, until 1918 Infanterist was also the common or generic designation to soldiers, rank independent, of the Infantry branch in the Austro-Hungarian Army as well as in the Army of the German Empire.

In line to the appropriate branch of service it did belong to the so-called Gemeine rank group, comparable to private, soldier or G.I. in Anglophone armed forces. Other Gemeine ranks were as follows:
Dragoner (en: dragoon),
Füsilier (fusilier | Am. also fusileer),
Grenadier,
Husar (hussar),
Infanterist (infantryman)
Kanonier (gunner, cannoneer),
Musketier (musketeer), etc.
Pionier (engineer)
Sanitätssoldat (medicalman)
Trainsoldat (trainman)
Ulan (uhlan)

Waffenrock k.u.k Infantrists until 1918

See also
 Rank insignia of the Austro-Hungarian armed forces

Reference/ source 
Dictionary to the German military history A-Me, 1st edition (Liz.5, P189/84, LSV:0547, B-Nr. 746 635 0), military publishing house of the GDR (VEB) – Berlin, 1985, Volume 1, page 307, «Infanterist».
BROCKHAUS, The encyclopedia in 24 volumes (1796–2001), Volume 10: 3-7653-3660-2, page 516; definition: «Infanterie»

Military of Austria-Hungary
Military ranks of Austria
Military ranks of Germany